The 1969 Pacific Southwest Open was a combined men's and women's tennis tournament played on outdoor hard courts at the Los Angeles Tennis Center in Los Angeles, California in the United States. The men's tournament was part of the Grand Prix tennis circuit. It was the 43rd edition of the tournament, the second in the open era, and ran from September 22 through September 28, 1969. Pancho Gonzales, aged 41, won the men's singles title, 20 years after winning it for the first time, and collected $4,000 first-prize money while Billie Jean King earned $1,500 for her singles title.

Finals

Men's singles

 Pancho Gonzales defeated  Cliff Richey 6–0, 7–5

Women's singles
 Billie Jean King defeated  Ann Jones 6–2, 6–3

Men's doubles

 Pancho Gonzales /  Ron Holmberg defeated  Jim McManus /  Jim Osborne 6–3, 6–4

Women's doubles
 Billie Jean King /  Rosie Casals defeated  Françoise Dürr /  Ann Jones 6–8, 8–6, 11–9

References

Los Angeles Open (tennis)
Pacific Southwest Open
Pacific Southwest Open
Pacific Southwest Open